The long-rayed whiptail or four-rayed rattail, Coryphaenoides subserrulatus, is a rattail of the genus Coryphaenoides, found circumpolar in all southern oceans, at depths between 550 and 1,200 m.  Its length is between 20 and 37 cm.

References

 
 Tony Ayling & Geoffrey Cox, Collins Guide to the Sea Fishes of New Zealand,  (William Collins Publishers Ltd, Auckland, New Zealand 1982) 

Macrouridae
Fish described in 1976